Khaptad Chhededaha (Nepali: खप्तड छेडेदह ) is a Gaupalika(Nepali: गाउपालिका ; gaupalika) in Bajura District in the Sudurpashchim Province of far-western Nepal. 
Khaptad Chhededaha has a population of 18575.The land area is 135.08 km2.

References

Rural municipalities in Bajura District
Rural municipalities of Nepal established in 2017